The men's 30 kilometre skiathlon competition in cross-country skiing at the 2022 Winter Olympics was held on 6 February, at the Kuyangshu Nordic Center and Biathlon Center in Zhangjiakou. The event, with half distance classic skiing and half distance skate skiing, was won by Alexander Bolshunov, for whom this is the first Olympic gold medal. Denis Spitsov finished second and Iivo Niskanen third.

Summary
The 2018 champion is Simen Hegstad Krüger who qualified for the Olympics but tested positive for COVID-19 just before the games. Even though he had no symptoms, he was not allowed to fly to China with the rest of the team and did not get a chance to defend the title. The silver medalist Martin Johnsrud Sundby and the bronze medalist Hans Christer Holund qualified as well, but Sundby was not selected for the skiathlon. The overall leader of the 2021–22 FIS Cross-Country World Cup before the Olympics was Johannes Høsflot Klæbo, and the distance leader was Alexander Bolshunov. The season was dominated by Norwegians and Russians, who together took 20 podium places in distance events out of 24, and three more podium places were taken by Iivo Niskanen. Bolshunov is the 2021 World Champion in 30 kilometre skiathlon, with Krüger and Holund being the silver and the bronze medalist, respectively.

Before the pit stop, Bolshunov and Niskanen ran away, followed by Spitsov, Holund and Pål Golberg. After the pit stop, Bolshunov ran away from Niskanen, who was caught up by Spitsov, and at 18 km Spitsov and Niskanen were already 30 seconds behind. Then Spitsov ran away from Niskanen. At 25 km, Spitsov was already almost a minute behind Bolshunov, and Niskanen almost a minute behind Spitsov, with Holund further 40 seconds behind Niskanen and visibly out of medal contention.

Qualification

Results
The race was started at 15:00.

References

Men's cross-country skiing at the 2022 Winter Olympics